Garfield Township, Nebraska may refer to the following places:

Garfield Township, Antelope County, Nebraska
Garfield Township, Buffalo County, Nebraska
Garfield Township, Cuming County, Nebraska
Garfield Township, Custer County, Nebraska
Garfield Township, Phelps County, Nebraska

See also
 Garfield Township (disambiguation)

Nebraska township disambiguation pages